St. Louis County has 88 municipalities and 10 unincorporated census-designated places:

List by population and area

General information

References

External links
St. Louis County maps.